Philippa Marion Wiggins (nee Glasgow)  (16 July 1925 – 16 March 2017) was a New Zealand academic, who made significant contributions to the understanding of the structure of water in living cells.

Academic career 

Wiggins studied science at the University of Canterbury, but although she wanted to continue in physics, women at the university were not allowed to progress past stage one. Having switched to chemistry, Wiggins then won a scholarship to research at the Davy-Faraday Laboratory at the Royal Institution in London. She then completed a PhD at King's College London. Wiggins took time off to have a family and did not return to full-time work until the age of 48.

Upon returning to New Zealand, Wiggins worked at the University of Canterbury with Walter Metcalf from 1962–1966. After this she worked at the University of Otago, and began working on water in living cells.

Wiggins was awarded a Career Fellowship by the New Zealand Medical Research Council. From 1970, she continued her research in the Department of Medicine at the University of Auckland, as Professor of Membrane Physiology.

In 1994 Wiggins co-founded BiostoreNZ, which commercialised preservation and storage technology for cells. BiostoreNZ was later acquired by Genesis Research and Development. Wiggins worked as a research scientist for Genesis Research in 1997, and continued to publish until 2009. She held more than 40 patents.

Wiggins died in Auckland on 16 March 2017 aged 91.

Research 
Wiggins realised that water can exist in two different states, and that the existence of these states explains the way that living cells work, and has implications for DNA and protein structure.

Awards 
Wiggins was appointed a Fellow of the Royal Society Te Apārangi in 1991. She received a medal for her research from the Health Research Council of New Zealand.

In 2017 Wiggins was featured as one of the Royal Society Te Apārangi's 150 women in 150 words.

Selected works

References 

New Zealand women academics
Fellows of the Royal Society of New Zealand
Physical chemists
Academic staff of the University of Otago
Alumni of King's College London
Academic staff of the University of Auckland
1925 births
2017 deaths